The Witch of Salem is a 1913 American silent short drama film directed by Raymond B. West and produced by Thomas H. Ince.  The films stars Clara Williams and Charles Ray.

Plot
Set in Salem, Massachusetts during the 1600s, the film tells the story a beautiful orphan girl named Prudence (Williams). Prudence is beloved by Old Hastings's son John (Ray). John must try to save Prudence's life when she is convicted of practicing witchcraft and is sentenced to being burned at the stake.

References

External links
 

1913 films
1910s historical drama films
American historical drama films
American silent short films
American black-and-white films
Films set in the 1660s
Films set in Massachusetts
Films set in the Thirteen Colonies
1913 short films
1913 drama films
Films directed by Raymond B. West
1910s American films
Silent American drama films
1910s English-language films
American drama short films